Alexandru Suvorov (born 2 February 1987) is a Moldovan footballer who plays as a midfielder for Sfântul Gheorghe and the Moldova national team.

Honours
Sheriff Tiraspol
Moldovan National Division: 2002–03, 2003–04, 2004–05, 2005–06, 2006–07, 2008–09
Moldovan Cup: 2005–06, 2008–09
Moldovan Super Cup: 2005
Commonwealth of Independent States Cup: 2003, 2009

Mordovia Saransk
Russian Football National League: 2013–14

Milsami Orhei
Moldovan National Division: 2014–15

International goals
Scores and results list Moldova's goal tally first.

References

External links 
 
 
 
 

1987 births
Living people
Association football forwards
Moldovan footballers
Moldovan expatriate footballers
Moldova international footballers
Footballers from Chișinău
Expatriate footballers in Poland
Moldovan expatriate sportspeople in Poland
FC Sheriff Tiraspol players
Moldovan Super Liga players
FC Tiraspol players
FC Mordovia Saransk players
MKS Cracovia (football) players
FC Milsami Orhei players
CSF Bălți players
Ekstraklasa players
Expatriate footballers in Russia
FC Sfîntul Gheorghe players
Russian First League players